The siege of Bursa occurred from 1317 until the capture on 6 April 1326, when the Ottomans deployed a bold plan to seize Prusa (modern-day Bursa, Turkey). The Ottomans had not captured a city before; the lack of expertise and adequate siege equipment at this stage of the war meant that the city fell only after six or nine years. 

The historian, Laonikos Chalkokondyles, notes that the Ottomans took advantage of the Byzantine civil war of 1321–1328 to capture the city: "Andronikos decided that he should hold the throne himself, as his grandfather had already grown old, and so they fell out with each other. He was too stubborn to submit and caused endless trouble. He brought in the Serbs and allied himself with the leading Greeks in his struggle for the throne. As a result they could do nothing to prevent the Turks from crossing over into Europe. It was at this time that Prusa was besieged, starved out, and taken by Osman, and other cities in Asia were captured."

According to some sources Osman I died of natural causes just before the fall of the city, while others suggest that he lived long enough to hear about the victory on his death-bed and was buried in Bursa afterwards.

Aftermath
After the fall of the city, his son and successor Orhan made Bursa the first official Ottoman capital and it remained so until 1366, when Edirne became the new capital. As a result, Bursa holds a special place in Ottoman history as their founding city, and also as the birthplace of Ottoman architecture (Bursa Grand Mosque (1399), Bayezid I Mosque (1395), Hüdavendigar Mosque (1385), and Yeşil Mosque) (1421). During his reign Orhan encouraged urban growth through the construction of buildings such as imarets, Turkish baths, mosques, inns and caravanserais, and he also built a mosque and a medrese in what is now known as the Hisar district, and after his death was buried there in his türbe (mausoleum) next to his father. The Arab Muslim traveler Ibn Battuta who visited Bursa in 1331 was impressed by the sultan and found Bursa an enjoyable city "with fine bazaars and wide streets, surrounded on all sides by gardens and running springs."

Importance
Paul K. Davis writes, "The capture of Bursa established Osman I (Othman) and his successors as the major power in Asia Minor, beginning the Ottoman Empire."

See also
Siege of Kulaca Hisar

References

Bursa
Bursa
Conflicts in 1326
1320s in the Byzantine Empire
History of Bursa
1326 in Asia
Bursa
1320s in the Ottoman Empire